Alexander Bain Moncrieff  (22 May 1845 – 11 April 1928) was an Irish-born engineer, active in Australia.

Moncrieff was the son of Alexander Rutherford Moncrieff, and was born in Dublin, Ireland. His family was of Scottish ancestry. He was educated principally at the Belfast Academy, and at 15 was articled to C. Miller, engineer in Dublin to the Great Southern and Western railway. His seven years apprenticeship included manual work in the blacksmith's shop, and he obtained there an understanding of his fellow workers which was valuable in later years. He was afterwards employed at the Glasgow locomotive works for two years, and subsequently at Dublin again, and in private practice in Hertfordshire, England. In November 1874 he obtained a position as engineering draftsman with the South Australian government, and arrived at Adelaide in February 1875. In 1879 he was made a resident engineer on the South Australian railways, and took charge of the Port Augusta to Oodnadatta line as it was gradually extended.

In 1888 Moncrieff became engineer in chief of South Australia at a salary of £1000 a year, and a little later the departments of waterworks, sewerage, harbours and jetties, were placed under his charge. He was elected M.I.C.E., England, in 1888, and America in 1894. He was chairman of the supply and tender board, and afterwards president of the public service association. He was Chairman of the Municipal Tramways Trust from its inception and appointment of W. G. T. Goodwan as its Chief Engineer in May 1907 then General Manager fifteen months later. He was appointed railway commissioner of South Australia in 1909 but also did important work outside that department. He was responsible for the planning of the outer harbour, the Bundaleer and Barossa water scheme, and the Happy Valley waterworks. He retired from the position of railway commissioner in 1916, and took pride in the fact that during the seven years he was in charge, no serious accident occurred for which any railway employee could be blamed. Moncrieff's motto had always been "safety first". He retired as chairman of the Municipal Tramways Trust in January 1922, after 15 years service. He had much to do with the early stages of the Murray Water scheme, though the actual work was not begun in his time. He was also responsible for the south-eastern drainage scheme. He died at Adelaide on 11 April 1928. He married in 1877 Mary Benson, daughter of Edward Sunter, who survived him with a son and a daughter. He was created C.M.G. in 1909.

Moncrieff was a man of outstanding capability, versatility and energy. During his 42 years connexion with the South Australian government he never had more than a few days holiday at a time, and never applied for sick leave. He made many improvements in the service, and filled a variety of offices with distinction. In private life he was interested in gardening, church work and mechanics, and was an omnivorous reader.

See also
Moncrieff Bay

References

1845 births
1928 deaths
Australian people of Anglo-Irish descent
Australian people of Scottish descent
Australian engineers
Companions of the Order of St Michael and St George